Whitney-on-Wye toll bridge is a single-carriageway, wood- and stone-construction in Herefordshire, England. The toll bridge carries the B4350 south from its junction with the A438, near Whitney-on-Wye, across the River Wye. It comprises two Grade II listed structures.

Bridge

A bridge was first built at the site around 1780 following authorisation by Act of Parliament and with the agreement of Tomkyns Dew, the lord of the manor. The stone structure of five bays replaced a ferry that had been operated by Dew. This bridge and two successors of similar design were all destroyed by flooding on the river, the last in 1795.

Another Act of Parliament was passed in 1796, allowing the crossing to be partially rebuilt in 1797 to a different design that used stone and wood. The central three bays were at this time replaced with a wood decking and superstructure. This beam and trestle design comprising three spans is how the bridge appears today. The two outer spans are buttressed masonry archways of sandstone and ashlar; the central wooden section has two double pontoons to support it.

A major program of reconstruction was undertaken in 1992–1993, costing around £300,000.

Toll house

The single-storey toll house on the northwest side of the crossing is also an 18th-century structure. Constructed in part of brick and in part of timber-framed stucco scantling, it was altered and extended to the rear in the mid-20th century. The toll house has a tariff board dated 1796 that lists  the crossing charges that applied around that time.

The bridge and toll house are both Grade II listed buildings.

Ownership
The Longfellow family of Brecon were joint funders of the 1797 reconstruction and various descendants owned the bridge until 1981, when it was bought by a couple called Bryant. It changed hands again in 1990 and, for £300,000, in 2002. The present owners purchased it for £400,000 in 2012 and announced plans to develop the facilities. It was estimated at that time that the toll income would be around £2,000 per week, which is free of taxes in accordance with the Act that authorised its construction. The tolls can only be increased with government permission and were last raised in 2009. Annual maintenance costs at the time of the 2012 change of ownership were estimated to be £12,000.

See also
List of crossings of the River Wye

References

External links

Toll bridges in England
Bridges completed in 1797
Bridges in Herefordshire
Grade II listed buildings in Herefordshire